Seymour "Sy" Sternberg (born June 24, 1943) is chairman and former CEO of New York Life Insurance Company. He retired as CEO on June 30, 2008. He also sits on the board of directors for the United States Chamber of Commerce, Northeastern University, CIT Group Incorporated, the  New York City Leadership Academy, and Express Scripts Holdings. Sternberg previously served as a member of the foundation board of Macaulay Honors College; he supported the college during its early years with a donation of $2 million from New York Life.

Sternberg is of Lithuanian and Romanian descent, and is Jewish.

References

External links
Sy Sternberg, Learning a Lesson from China August 9, 2005, Wall Street Journal Article

Northeastern University alumni
American businesspeople in insurance
Living people
1943 births
American people of Romanian-Jewish descent
American people of Lithuanian-Jewish descent
New York Life Insurance Company
20th-century American businesspeople